Chancelor D. Edwards (January 28, 1901 – 	June 2, 1983) was an American baseball catcher in the Negro leagues. He played with the Cleveland Tigers in 1928.

References

External links
 and Baseball-Reference Black Baseball stats and Seamheads

Cleveland Tigers (baseball) players
1901 births
1983 deaths
Baseball players from Texas
Baseball catchers
People from Daingerfield, Texas
20th-century African-American sportspeople